Christopher Quinten (born Christopher Bell; 12 July 1957) is a British actor, best known for his role as Brian Tilsley on Coronation Street, which he played from 1978 to 1989.

Career 
Quinten started his career as a dancer in West End productions, including the Victoria Palace with Cilla Black and Jimmy Tarbuck.
He turned to acting and had his first role in the 1978 film International Velvet, starring Tatum O'Neal. This appearance led to small parts in television series including Quatermass and Hazell, and was also noticed by the Coronation Street casting offices, who gave Ivy Tilsley, the oft-seen Baldwin's worker, a son. Quinten was then signed to the programme, for which he worked for over a decade. His pairing with Gail Potter (played by Helen Worth) proved very popular for the serial in the 1980s.

In 1989, Quinten told the casting office that he was going to move to the United States to marry his then-fiancée, American talk show host Leeza Gibbons. The couple had met in 1988 in New Zealand while appearing on a Telethon, and Quinten had been hoping to stay in Coronation Street as a part-time character, but the producers rejected his offer to stay on part-time, and at the end of 1988 the decision was made to kill the character off. His final episode was aired on 15 February 1989, when Brian Tilsley was stabbed to death by a gang of teenagers outside a nightclub.

Once settled in the United States, Quinten and Gibbons worked together on the film RoboCop 2 (in which he played a reporter), and had one daughter, Lexi Quinten. The couple divorced in 1991. Quinten married Paula Holmes in 1992, but they later separated.

Quinten returned to Britain and appeared on various chat shows. In 1994, he played Mr. Barraclough in an episode of the ITV comedy series Surgical Spirit.  In 1998, it was reported that he was now touring the country with a one-man comedy rock act, and was also working as an after-dinner speaker. In 2000, he briefly returned to television acting with a guest role in the BBC soap opera Doctors.

Quinten has had a long career in pantomimes. In 2010 he played Abanazar in the Consett Empire's production of Aladdin, and Ramsbottom in Snow White and the Seven Dwarfs at Oswaldtwistle Civic Theatre in 2011.

He appeared in Peter Kay's "Sit Down for Comic Relief" sketch alongside Rustie Lee & Bob Carolgees. In 2016 it was reported that Quinten now works at Stringfellows erotic nightclub in London.

In April 2020, he appeared in an episode of Hollyoaks as Mark Kelly, father of regular character Kyle Kelly, played by Adam Rickitt who previously also played Quinten's onscreen son Nick Tilsley in Coronation Street.

Personal life 
Quinten was married to American talk show host Leeza Gibbons from 1989–1991. They had a daughter together in 1989.

With partner Alison Slater (ex-Stringfellow's dancer), he has a daughter Sydney (b. 2005).

In August 2005, Quinten was charged with rape. Following a trial in June 2006, he was found not guilty.

On 10 June 2019, Quinten became engaged to his lap dancer girlfriend, Robyn Delabarre, on her twenty-first birthday.

References

External links 

English male soap opera actors
1957 births
Living people
People from Middlesbrough
Actors from Yorkshire